Primož Peterka is a Slovenian former ski jumper who competed from 1996 to 2011. He is one of the most successful athletes from Slovenia, having won fifteen individual World Cup competitions, two consecutive overall World Cup titles, a Ski Flying World Cup title, and the Four Hills Tournament.

Career
Peterka started ski jumping on a small hill (with a K-point at around 20 metres) near his hometown of Moravče, a small town about 30 km northeast from Ljubljana. He later joined the Triglav ski club in Kranj.

1995–1996
Peterka made his World Cup debut on 4 January 1996. Due to the poor performance of Slovenian competitors at the time, Peterka was brought in as a replacement for the Four Hills Tournament event in Innsbruck, where he finished eighth. Peterka continued his good form, winning the competitions in Zakopane and Falun, and finished the season tenth overall. He also finished second behind Michael Uhrmann at the 1996 Junior World Championships.

1996–1997

The 1996–97 season was a great success for Peterka. He won seven individual World Cup competitions and won both the overall World Cup title and the Four Hills Tournament. He also finished first in the ski flying standings. On 9 February 1997, Peterka became the first Slovenian to record a jump over 200 metres, landing at 203 metres in Kulm.

1997–1998

In the 1997–98 season, Peterka won four individual competitions and a second consecutive World Cup title, defeating Kazuyoshi Funaki in the final competition of the season. At the 1998 Winter Olympics in Nagano, Peterka claimed fifth place in the individual large hill competition and sixth in the individual normal hill competition.

Later career
In the 2001–02 World Cup season, Peterka returned to the ski jumping elite. At the 2002 Winter Olympics in Salt Lake City, he won the bronze team medal. The 2002–03 season was also successful, with Peterka winning two individual events (Kuusamo and Garmisch-Partenkirchen) and finishing the season seventh overall.

From 2004 onwards, Peterka never finished in the top 10 in an individual World Cup event. However, at the 2005 World Championships in Oberstdorf he won another bronze team medal for Slovenia, together with Jure Bogataj, Rok Benkovič and Jernej Damjan. This made Peterka the first Slovenian ski jumper to win medals both at the Olympics and at the World Championships. After the 2010–11 season, Peterka officially retired from competitive ski jumping.

Personal life
Peterka was born in Prikrnica, near Ljubljana, Slovenia (then part of Yugoslavia). His younger brother Uroš was also a ski jumper.

World Cup

Standings

Individual wins

In popular culture
Three sports documentary films have been made about his life and career. The first is called Vleci, Primož and was directed by Beno Hvala in 1997, detailing the story of Peterka's early career. The second, Peterka: leto odločitve, was directed by Vlado Škafar in 2003 and focuses on Peterka's personal crisis and his struggle to find his way back to the top. The third was made in 2011 by RTV Slovenija, called Skoki so moje življenje, directed by Tomaž Kovšca and starring Aleš Potočnik and Polona Bertoncelj.

References

External links

 

1979 births
Living people
Skiers from Ljubljana
Ski jumpers at the 1998 Winter Olympics
Ski jumpers at the 2002 Winter Olympics
Ski jumpers at the 2006 Winter Olympics
Holmenkollen Ski Festival winners
Slovenian male ski jumpers
Olympic ski jumpers of Slovenia
Olympic bronze medalists for Slovenia
Olympic medalists in ski jumping
FIS Nordic World Ski Championships medalists in ski jumping
Medalists at the 2002 Winter Olympics
21st-century Slovenian people